Iolaus kayonza is a butterfly in the family Lycaenidae. It is found in Uganda (Kayonza and Kamengo).

References

Butterflies described in 1958
Iolaus (butterfly)
Endemic fauna of Uganda
Butterflies of Africa